Tizimín  is a city located in the Tizimín Municipality in the Mexican state of Yucatán, It is located in the Coastal Zone of the same state.

It has an average height of 20 meters and is located at a distance of 1,492 km from Mexico City, 167 km from state capital city, Merida, Yucatan, 54 km from Rio Lagartos, 50 km from Valladolid, Yucatan, 36 km from Ek' Balam and 27 km from Espita.

The city is known for its traditional fair of the Biblical Magi, celebrated in late December and early January. It is also a major Mexican handcraft market selling rebozos, huipils, tablecloths, jewelry and guayaberas. This fair gives the city its nickname of "King's City".

In 2010 was the second largest city in population of the eastern Yucatan, only after Valladolid, Yucatán. It was also the third largest city and fourth largest by number of people around the state. Currently is the leading producer of beef cattle in the state of Yucatan, and is the central urban service provider the northeastern region of the state.

Climate

Sister cities 
Tizimín has one sister city since 2011, the city is Evansville, Indiana in the United States.

Transportation
The city is served by the Cupul National Airport .

See also 
 Tizimín Municipality
 Evansville, Indiana
 Yucatán (state)

References

External links

 Yucatan.gob.mx - Official website of the State of Yucatan.
 Tizimín.gob.mx - Official website of the city.

Populated places in Yucatán